Wado may refer to:

 WADO, a radio station in New York City;
 Wadō (era), a Japanese era
 Wadō-ryū, a style of karate
 Wadokai, a karate organization
 WADO, a standard for web access to DICOM objects